Keluarga Cemara (literally translated as Cemara's Family) is an Indonesian television series which first aired from October 6, 1996 to February 28, 2005. Based on a serialized novel with same title by Arswendo Atmowiloto, the series was originally broadcast on RCTI from 1996 to 2003, and was continued under the title Keluarga Cemara: Kembali ke Asal (English: Cemara's Family: Back to Origin), which aired on TV7 in 2004 and 2005.

As the title implies, Keluarga Cemara tells the story of a girl named Cemara, with her family, who moved to start a new life in a small town after her father's business in the city went bankrupt. It stars Adi Kurdi, Cherrya Agustina Hendiawan, Anisa Fujianti, and Puji Lestari. Also featured Lia Waroka, Novia Kolopaking, and Anneke Putri who take turns playing the role of Mother (Emak) during the series.

Together with the Lorong Waktu and Si Doel Anak Sekolahan, Keluarga Cemara is often referred to as the golden masterpiece from the Indonesian television series.

Plot
The story of a rich family who became poor. Abah was once a successful and wealthy businessman in Jakarta. For some reason, Abah's business went bankrupt and his family fell into poverty. Finally Abah and his family decided to move to a village in a small town. Since that incident, all of Abah's family members have tried to live their daily lives with Abah being a pedicab driver and Emak being an opaque seller who is assisted by her children, namely Euis, Cemara alias Ara, and Agil. But poverty does not change their hearts because they believe that the most valuable treasure is family.

Cast
 Adi Kurdi as Abah
 Lia Waroka as Emak (episode 1–17, 284–412)
 Novia Kolopaking as Emak (episode 18–?)
 Anneke Putri as Emak (episode ?–283)
 Cherrya Agustina Hendiawan as Euis
 Anisa Fujianti as Cemara/Ara
 Puji Lestari as Agil
 Wina Hendrawan as Aunt Pressier
 Belita Ayu Selviana as Pipin Pressier
 Muslih Noor as Mr. Jana
 Rochmah Usman as Mrs.Salmah
 Nurani Sandra Dewi as Aunt Iyos (episode 1–17)
 Ulfie Syahrul as Aunt Iyos (episode 18–?)

Remake
It was announced that Keluarga Cemara will be remade as a web series. The series will be produced by Visinema Pictures and directed by Ismail Basbeth. The series will be released on 24 September 2022 on Disney+ Hotstar.

References

1990s Indonesian television series
1996 Indonesian television series debuts
2000s Indonesian television series
2005 Indonesian television series endings
Indonesian drama television series